Tomoplagia arsinoe is a species of tephritid or fruit flies in the genus Tomoplagia of the family Tephritidae.

Distribution
Colombia.

References

Tephritinae
Insects described in 1942
Diptera of South America